The 2000–01 Western Professional Hockey League season was the fifth and final season of the Western Professional Hockey League, a North American minor pro league. 14 teams participated in the regular season, and the Bossier-Shreveport Mudbugs were the league champions.

Regular season

President's Cup-Playoffs

External links
 Season 2000/01 on hockeydb.com

Western Professional Hockey League seasons
WPHL